A High Five for Glenn Burke is a middle-grade novel by Phil Bildner, published February 25, 2020 by Farrar, Straus and Giroux, about Silas Wade, who learns about Glenn Burke, a gay, Major League baseball player in the 1970s and begins to accept his own sexual identity.

Reception 
A High Five for Glenn Burke received a starred review from Booklist, as well as positive reviews from Kirkus, The Bulletin of the Center for Children's Books, and School Library Journal.

Alongside being selected by the Junior Library Guild, A High Five for Glenn Burke received the following accolades:

 Lambda Literary Award for LGBTQ Children's Literature (2021)
 NCTE Charlotte Huck Award Honor Book (2021)
 Bank Street College of Education Best Book of 2021
 Chicago Public Library Best Fiction for Older Readers (2020)

Controversy 
Bildner was invited to a school in New Jersey but then disinvited "once they learned the book had LGBTQ themes." Bildner has noted that he knows "it won’t be the last time it happens." 

He hopes parents and schools will continue advocating for books like A High Five for Glenn Burke, especially when they work with middle school students because "[t]hese kids are trying to figure out who they are and where they fit in, and they need to know a book like this exists." He continued, noting that "Tragically, when you erase LGBTQ books and eliminate access to them, you erase these kids and their narratives. And, when you do this, lives are at stake. These kids need to know that their stories and their lives, matter. Teachers and librarians need to be caretakers—not gatekeepers—to create a safe space for all kids."

References 

2020 children's books
2020s LGBT novels
Farrar, Straus and Giroux books
Baseball novels